The Royal Australian Army Nursing Corps (RAANC) is a Corps of the Australian Army. It was formed in February 1951 from the Royal Australian Army Nursing Service. A Corps Badge was introduced in 1951 with the motto Pro Humanitate (for Humanity). It embraces the values of compassion and service to others, reflecting the care and dedication provided to the wounded and sick. Approval for the Corps flag was granted on 7 February 1958.

History

Foundation
The history of RAANC can be traced back to the formation of the Australian Army Nursing Service on 13 August 1898. At the time it was made up of one Lady Superintendent and 24 nurses. The service saw its first action in the Boer war, when the New South Wales and Victorian governments arranged for a detachment of nurses to deploy with their troops to Africa. Groups and individual nurses from Western Australia, South Australia and Queensland also served in the Anglo-Boer War. Due to the performance of the nurses in that conflict, an order was given in 1902 for the formation of the Australian Army Nursing Service under the control of the Federal Government. It is this order's promulgation, 1 July 1903, which is celebrated as RAANC Corps day.

First World War
2,139 AANS female nurses served overseas in the World War I with 423 serving in Australia, together with 130 Australians who worked with Queen Alexandra's Imperial Military Nursing Service. 25 died on active service and 388 were decorated.

Second World War
In World War II, 3,477 women joined the AANS with 71 members losing their lives (23 in battle and 18 as a result of accident or illness). Thirty-eight nurses became Prisoners of War. A total of 137 decorations were awarded to members of the AANS, including two George Medals. In 1945, Princess Alice, Duchess of Gloucester, became the Honorary Colonel, and in 1948 the service was renamed as the Royal Australian Army Nursing Service. It became part of the Australian Regular Army the following year, eventually becoming a corps in February 1951.

Alliances
  – Queen Alexandra's Royal Army Nursing Corps

Order of precedence

See also
Women in the Australian military
Women in Australia
Royal Australian Army Medical Corps

Footnotes

External links

Official Nursing Corps Website

Nursing
Australian army units with royal patronage
Military nursing
Military units and formations established in 1951
1951 establishments in Australia